Achim Freyer (born 30 March 1934) is a German stage director, set designer and painter.  A protégé of Bertolt Brecht, Freyer has become one of the world's leading opera directors, working throughout Europe and, since 2002, in the United States, principally with the Los Angeles Opera.  Since 1992, Freyer has developed a number of productions featuring his own troupe of performers, known as the Freyer Ensemble.

Freyer staged a controversial production of Wagner's Ring Cycle in Los Angeles in 2010, praised by many critics but criticised by some of its own stars.

Awards 
 1987: Kainz-Medaille of Vienna
 1990: Order of Merit of the Federal Republic of Germany
 2000: 
 2005: 
 2007: 
 2015: Nestroy Theatre Prize for his life's work
 2016: Der Faust in the category Bühne/Kostüm (stage/costume) for Esame di mezzanotte, Nationaltheater Mannheim
 2022: Der Faust, lifetime achievement

References

External links 

 
 Achim Freyer freyer-ensemble.de
 
 Achim-Freyer-Archiv Archive of the Academy of Arts, Berlin
 Vita. Achim Freyer Foundation
 Dorothea Marcus: "Die westliche Freiheit hat mich gefesselt." / Der Regisseur und Bühnenbildner Achim Freyer (interview, in German, in Kulturfragen. Debatten und Dokumente) Deutschlandfunk 19 January 2020

German designers
1934 births
Living people
Officers Crosses of the Order of Merit of the Federal Republic of Germany
Members of the Academy of Arts, Berlin
German male writers